The Banja Luka Stock Exchange or BLSE (Banjalučka berza) is a stock exchange which operates in the city of Banja Luka in the Republika Srpska, Bosnia and Herzegovina. The Banja Luka Stock Exchange is a member of the Federation of Euro-Asian Stock Exchanges.

History
 15 July 1998 - The adoption of The Law on Securities provided the necessary legal framework to establish the capital market of the Republika Srpska.
 4 May 2000 - The National Assembly of the Republic of Srpska appointed the first members of Republika Srpska Securities Commission.
 26 February 2001 - Established Central Registry of Securities (CRHoV).
 9 May 2001 - Eight banks and one company trading in securities signed the Contract that established the Banja Luka Stock Exchange.
 9 August 2001 - Republika Srpska Securities Commission issued working permit to Banja Luka Stock Exchange.
 29 November 2001 - The first equity from the privatisation programme was registered in the Central Registry of Securities.
 5 March 2002 - Signed contract on transfer of license between the Directorate for Privatisation and the BLSE that provided BLSE with electronic trading system (BTS) developed by the Ljubljana Stock Exchange (LJSE).
 14 March 2002 - The first BLSE trading session took place, involving six Members that traded 20 listed securities.
 12 September 2002 - The Law on Takeover came into force.
 30 September 2002 - The BLSE and the LJSE signed Memorandum on cooperation and exchange of information.
 10 December 2002 - A contract on regional co-operation in field of education and financial markets was signed with the Belgrade Stock Exchange.
 24 January 2003 - The first session of The Listing Commission took place and stocks of 13 Privatisation Investment Funds admitted to the official market of the BLSE.
 11 February 2003 - The first transactions concluded with shares of PIFs.
 20 August 2003 - The first auction for state owned capital took a place on the BLSE
 23 September 2003 - Shares of Rafinerija ulja a.d. Modriča were listed on the official market of the BLSE as the first company listed on official market in Bosnia.
 27 April 2004 - The Stock Exchange Index of Republic of Srpska (BIRS) established.
 29 July 2004 - Investment Funds Index of Republic of Srpska (FIRS) established.
 29 December 2005 - The Index of the Power Utility Companies of Republic of Srpska (ERS10) established.

Strategy
The strategy of the Banja Luka Stock Exchange is to further improve quality and create cheaper services for its Members and to provide a transparent and fair trading environment for domestic and foreign issuers and investors. The BLSE will continue working at achieving the standard of services comparable with those prevailing on developed capital markets.

Objectives:
 to protect the interest of investors;
 to promote investment in securities;
 to provide liquidity and "depth" in the capital market of the Republika Srpska
 to introduce new financial instruments in the capital market of the Republika Srpska
 to provide conditions for public companies to raise the capital required to finance their development plans
 to promote the listing of securities issued by local companies
 to attract foreign investors through use of promotional campaign to connect with regional capital market
 to connect with regional capital market.

Official market
The official market is a prestigious part of the stock exchange market, where, apart from the general conditions, there are also requirements of specific conditions regarding the amount of equity, class diversification in public, business performance and objectivity of financial statements. With consideration of the level of development of the capital market of the Republika Srpska, the biggest number of securities from privatisation process is listed on the free market of the BLSE.

General conditions for listing securities on organised market are:
 possibility  to trade in an organised way with those securities
 securities have been paid in full
 freely transferable
 issued in non material form.

On the official market those securities may be listed which apart from the general conditions meet the following criteria:              
Years of existence: 3
Reality and objectivity of financial statements: Audited financial statements
Equity size: BAM 5,000,000 (BAM 1 = EUR 0.5113)
Min. size of class of shares: BAM 1,000,000
Class diversification in public: at least 15%
Number of shareholders: at least 50
             
Listing criteria for bonds:
Years of existence: 3
Reality and objectivity of financial statements: Audited financial statements
Issue nominal value: BAM 1,000,000
               
The bonds of the Republika Srpska can be admitted to the official market of the Stock Exchange with no specific conditions or restrictions.

Currently on the official market, PIFs segment, shares of 13 Privatisation Investment Funds are listed. In the next period it is expected that the best companies apply for admission to the official market of the BLSE.

Free market
The free market lists securities that meet all general conditions for listing. Securities are listed on the free market segment if required by the issuer or by the law. Shares from privatization process and publicly offered shares are listed on the free market after registration with the Central Registry of Securities. The number of shares listed on this market segment was 630 on June 31, 2003 according to the Stock Exchange Monitor (see links below), and it is expected to reach 830 after the registration of shares from privatization in the Central Registry of Securities has been completed.

Market capitalisation

Indexes
 BIRS, an index of 12 leading shares on the stock exchange, including Telekom Srpske and Rafinerija ulja Modriča.
 FIRS, an index of 13 privatisation-investment funds in Republika Srpska.

Clearing and settlement
The Central Registry of Securities for all members of the Central Registry takes on fulfillment of monetary liabilities and fulfillment of obligation to transfer securities arising from transactions concluded on the Stock Exchange or other regulated public market.

The Registry performs the following activities:
 registration and maintenance of securities, i.e. information on securities, security ownership and all transactions transferring the ownership or other changes in the status of securities, both material and non material form
 registration and maintenance of information defining the ownership or other rights incorporated, both in material and non material securities
 record-keeping of the issuer accounts, i.e. accounts of security owners, and issuing of certificates on status and changes in those accounts
 transfers, depositing, settlement and clearing activities arising from transactions with securities!

The Central Registry is a unique database on all securities that are traded on the securities market, and especially the database of those data pertaining to the registration of ownership and changes of ownership of the securities. This database has to include all securities. Transactions concluded on the BLSE are settled on T+3.

Foreign Investment Regulation and Taxation
A foreign investor has equal rights as a native investor concerning rights and liabilities and legal status in an enterprise. A foreign investor acquires the right on additional guaranties that are not granted to local persons since the Constitutions of the Republika Srpska prescribes that the right acquired by investment of capital shall not be reduced by the law or any other regulation and guarantees free expatriation of profit and of capital after the end of investment.

Forms of foreign investments in accordance with the Law as follows: 
 establishment of legal body fully owned by the foreign investor
 establishment of legal body jointly owned by national and foreign investors
 investments in existing legal bodies
 special forms of investments.

According to the Law on Enterprises in the Republic of Srpska it is possible to establish: 
 public enterprise
 partnership
 limited partnership
 stock company
 limited liability company.

Foreign persons may acquire shares and stocks. Stock company and limited liability company may be established with equity in form of money, goods or rights.

Members of the BLSE
Eurobroker a.d. Banja Luka
Nova banka a.d. Banja Luka
Raiffeisen capital a.d. Banja Luka
Monet broker a.d. Banja Luka
Advantis broker a.d. Banja Luka

See also
 Republika Srpska Securities Commission
 List of stock exchanges
 List of European stock exchanges
 Sarajevo Stock Exchange

External links
Banja Luka Stock Exchange, official website
Republika Srpska Securities Commission
The Central Registry of Securities
The Government of the Republika Srpska
Directorate for Privatisation
The Central Bank of Bosnia and Herzegovina
Stock Exchange Monitor, information on the South-East European stock markets
Banja Luka Stock Exchange, unofficial WAP site

Stock exchanges in Europe
Economy of Bosnia and Herzegovina
Economy of Banja Luka
Financial services companies established in 2001